The 1940 South Dakota State Jackrabbits football team was an American football team that represented South Dakota State University in the North Central Conference (NCC) during the 1940 college football season. In its third season under head coach Jack V. Barnes, the team compiled a 4–3–1 record and outscored opponents by a total of 78 to 57.

Schedule

References

South Dakota State
South Dakota State Jackrabbits football seasons
South Dakota State Jackrabbits football